Nye is a former town two miles north of Laredo in southwestern Webb County, Texas, United States. It was named after Thomas C. Nye, a local planter who introduced Bermuda Onions into the community in 1898.

The area was eventually absorbed by the neighboring city of Laredo.

References
Handbook of Texas Online, s.v. "Nye, Texas" (accessed May 23, 2007)

Neighborhoods in Laredo, Texas